Roko Šimić (born 10 September 2003) is a Croatian professional footballer who plays as a forward for Zürich on loan from Austrian Bundesliga club Red Bull Salzburg.

Career 

Šimić made his senior debut for Lokomotiva Zagreb on 16 August 2020 in a 6–0 league defeat to Dinamo Zagreb, getting substituted on for Indrit Tuci in the 66th minute. He was given an opportunity by coach Goran Tomić due to the club's lack of squad depth. During the season, which was marked by Lokomotiva's struggle to preserve the first league status, Šimić made 26 appearances and scored four goals. He scored his debut goal for Lokomotiva on 7 October 2020, in a 3–2 victory over Gaj Mače in the Croatian Cup. His debut league goals came on 21 April 2021 when he scored a brace in the 4–0 victory over Varaždin.

Red Bull Salzburg 

The first rumours that Red Bull Salzburg was following Šimić appeared in April 2021 in Kleine Zeitung. Šimić signed a three-year deal with the Austrian club on 18 July 2021. With income of €4 million, it is Lokomotiva's most expensive transfer surpassing that of Ivo Grbić to Atlético Madrid. Despite the initial plan to leave the player at Lokomotiva on loan for half a season, he moved to Austria immediately and joined Salzburg's feeder club FC Liefering. He made his debut for Liefering on 30 July 2021, getting substituted on for Dijon Kameri in the 46th minute, and scored his debut goal within a minute in a 2–1 victory over St. Pölten. On 10 October, he extended his contract with Salzburg until 2025, after impressing the club executives by scoring six goals in nine league appearances and two goals in two Youth League appearances. On 20 October 2021, he made his senior team and Champions League debut, replacing Noah Okafor in the 87th minute of the 3–1 victory over VfL Wolfsburg. Four days later, he made his league debut for the senior team, replacing Karim Adeyemi in the 87th minute of the 4–1 victory over Sturm Graz. During Salzburg's path to the Youth League Final, Šimić contributed seven goals and three assists, making him the joint-top goalscorer of the competition together with Mads Hansen and Aral Şimşir.

On 5 January 2023, Šimić joined reigning Swiss Super League champions Zürich on loan until the end of the 2022–23 season. He scored two goals on his debut on 21 January 2023 against FC Luzern, after entering the game only in the 77th minute.

Personal life 

He is the son of former footballer Dario Šimić and his wife Jelena Medić, and was born in Milan during his father's stint with AC Milan. He has three brothers – Viktor, Nikolas and David. He is also a nephew of Josip Šimić. Roko Šimić is also confirmation sponsor of Lukas Kačavenda, and a distant relative of Herzegovinian hajduk Andrijica Šimić,

Career statistics

Club 

Notes

References

External links 

2003 births
Living people
Footballers from Milan
Croatian footballers
Croatia under-21 international footballers
Croatia youth international footballers
Italian footballers
Italian people of Croatian descent
Italian people of Bosnia and Herzegovina descent
Association football forwards
NK Lokomotiva Zagreb players
FC Red Bull Salzburg players
FC Liefering players
FC Zürich players
Croatian Football League players
2. Liga (Austria) players
Austrian Football Bundesliga players
Swiss Super League players
Croatian expatriate footballers
Croatian expatriate sportspeople in Austria
Expatriate footballers in Austria
Croatian expatriate sportspeople in Switzerland
Expatriate footballers in Switzerland